The Le Hardi class consisted of twelve destroyers built for the  (French Navy) during the late 1930s. Only seven ships were ultimately completed while construction of the remaining five ships was interrupted by the French defeat in the Battle of France in May–June 1940 and were never finished. The seven ships that were seaworthy sailed for French North Africa to prevent their capture by the advancing Germans. Several ships later sailed for French West Africa where  played a minor role in the Battle of Dakar in September. The Germans captured two ships that were still under construction and attempted to finish them both before abandoning the effort in 1943.

The Vichy French reformed the High Sea Forces ( (FHM)) after the French surrender in late June. After most of the sister ships returned to France in November, three of them were assigned to the FHM and the others were placed in reserve. The seven completed ships were scuttled in Toulon when the Germans occupied Vichy France in November 1942. The  (Royal Italian Navy) salvaged most of them during 1943 and towed three of them to Italy for repairs. All of the ships were captured by the Germans after the Italian armistice in September, but they made little effort to finish the repairs. They did attempt to complete , but were unsuccessful before the end of the war. The three ships in Italy were scuttled in April 1945 to prevent their capture by the Allies; the remaining ships in Toulon were either sunk by Allied bombers or scuttled by the Germans after Operation Dragoon, the Allied invasion of southern France, in August 1944. All of the ships were salvaged for scrap or broken up on the slipway after the war except for L'Opiniâtre which was launched after the war and used for testing before she was scrapped in 1971. Lansquenet was refloated and towed back to Toulon in 1946 and was still incomplete when she was scrapped in 1958.

Background and description

As the detailed design was prepared over the next two years, the Le Hardis were enlarged and given extra guns to counter the large destroyers of the Italian  and Japanese es. Now significantly larger and faster than the L'Adroits, the Le Hardi-class design was approved on 10 August 1934.

The hull was divided by a dozen bulkheads into 13 watertight compartments. The Le Hardis were equipped with a pair of  turbogenerators and a pair of  diesel generators. Their crew consisted of 10 officers and 177 enlisted men.

Armament and protection
The main armament of the Le Hardi-class ships consisted of six 45-caliber Canon de 130 mm Modèle 1932 guns in three twin-gun turrets, one forward and a superfiring pair aft of the superstructure. The guns had an elevation range between −10° and +30° and each one was provided with 170 semi-armour-piercing and 10 star shells.

The Modèle 1932 guns had a rate of fire of 10–15 rounds per minute although the rammer was underpowered and often caused jams in the loading system. In one engagement against a British destroyer in September 1940,  was only able to fire 14 rounds in six minutes before all her guns broke down. Given time and training, these problems could be fixed as Le Hardi demonstrated during the Battle of Dakar when she fired 60 rounds without any problems; she had previously fired over 700 rounds during thirteen sessions on gunnery ranges.

The primary anti-aircraft (AA) armament of the Le Hardi-class ships was intended to consist of a twin-gun mount for 70-caliber Canon de  Modèle 1935 guns. Development of the automatic weapon was still in progress when the ships were completed in 1939–1940 and a twin-gun mount for 50-caliber Canon de 37 mm Modèle 1933 guns on the aft superstructure was installed instead. These manually-loaded guns could elevate to a maximum of +80° and they had a practical rate of fire of 15–21 rounds per minute. The ships carried a total of 2,960 rounds for the guns. The ships were also fitted with two twin Hotchkiss  Modèle 1929 anti-aircraft machine gun mounts abreast the bridge. Ready-use lockers stowed 480 rounds near each gun and the remaining 1,920 rounds per gun were in the magazine.

The ships carried one triple and two twin sets of  torpedo tubes amidships; the twin-tube aft mounts were positioned one on each broadside, but the triple-tube forward mount could traverse to both sides. One depth charge chute was built into the stern in the first batch of six ships; this housed eight  depth charges. The other side of the stern was used for the handling gear for a towed Ginocchio captive anti-submarine torpedo, but this was removed before they were completed. The second batch of six ships had two depth charge chutes in the stern with a capacity of a dozen depth charges.

Fire control
The fire-control system of the Le Hardi class as designed was identical to that of the larger  s with a director equipped with a  OPL Modèle PC.1936 stereoscopic rangefinder built around the base of the foremast above the bridge. The director sent the range to the  where it was fed into a Modèle 1929 electro-mechanical computer which calculated the firing solution and transmitted it to the turrets. The  intended to equip the turrets so they could be controlled by the director, but abandoned the effort in 1942 after equipment trials were unsuccessful and it concluded that the ships lacked the necessary electrical capacity.

Space and weight had been allocated for a director for the 37-millimetre Modèle 1935 guns, but when this was unavailable a  rangefinder on a pedestal for the main armament was substituted in all ships except  which received an enclosed mounting with a five-meter rangefinder. A high-angle  rangefinder was fitted for the ant-aircraft guns.

A torpedo director was located above the primary gunnery director on the foremast. It used a separate five-meter OPL Modèle 1935 stereoscopic rangefinder to provide the bearing and range to a Modèle 1933 electro-mechanical computer which calculated the torpedo firing angle. This was sent to the remotely controlled torpedo tubes, and the command to fire could be given by either the torpedo director or either of the secondary positions on the wings of the bridge.

Modifications
In early 1941 a pair of single mounts for Browning 13.2-millimetre AA machine guns were added to all ships on the quarterdeck. In late 1941, Le Hardi had her anti-aircraft suite reinforced and rearranged. The twin Hotchkiss machine gun mounts were repositioned on the quarterdeck and a pair of single mounts for  Hotchkiss AA guns were installed in their place in front of the bridge. In addition the Browning machine guns were transferred to newly built platforms on the sides of the superfiring turret aft. Later in the year and in early 1942, L'Adroit, Casque and Mameluk received the same modifications.

Revised design
It now viewed a dual-purpose (DP) armament as a requirement for ships intended to escort capital ships. This was the role of the Le Hardi class and the staff wanted to evaluate how the four ships scheduled to be laid down in mid-1939 could be modified to accommodate the DP guns. Its torpedo armament was reduced to a pair of triple mounts.

The start of the war in September 1939 completely disrupted this plan as building of these ships was suspended. When construction was resumed in March 1940, Admiral François Darlan, the navy's Chief of Staff, was informed that no newly designed destroyers could enter service before 1944, but that either three Le Hardi-class ships or four  could begin sea trials in 1943. On 28 April Darlan decided on modified Le Hardis with either the originally specified hull or the proposed larger version, depending on how advanced the design work was. Their armament was to consist of two or three 130-millimetre DP guns with an elevation limited to 40 or 50°; as the mounts were not likely be ready before the ships were completed, he proposed an interim armament of three or four 100-millimetre guns in high-angle mounts. The rest of the armament was to consist of one twin and two single mounts for 37-millimetre AA guns, two twin-gun AA machine gun mounts, two triple mounts for torpedoes and a pair of depth charge rails and a pair of depth charge throwers for twenty 100-kilogram depth charges.

Ships
The name ship of the class was authorized in the 1932 Naval Estimates, but construction was significantly delayed by the financial impact of the Great Depression and bilateral arms limitation talks between France and Fascist Italy that caused the French Parliament to suspend all new naval construction until 1934. Even then Le Hardi was not laid down until late the following year, to be followed a few months later by two sister ships authorized in the 1935 Naval Estimates and then three more in mid-1936 as part of that year's Naval Estimates. The remaining six ships were authorized in the 1937, 1938 and 1938bis Naval Estimates.

Construction of the first six ships was slowed by the social and industrial disruptions associated with the  that took power in 1936 so that Le Hardi was the only ship to complete all of her sea trials. The next four ships began their acceptance trials between March and May 1940 and all entered service in June with the Germans advancing on the naval bases in Brittany. The most complete of the remaining ships was finished after the armistice and six of the last seven ships were never completed.

Service history
Le Hardi entered service on 2 June 1940 and escorted an ocean liner to Casablanca, French Morocco, before sailing to Brest. Fleuret helped to escort the battleship  from Casablanca to Dakar, French West Africa, on 12 June. The first mission of Épée and Mameluk was to rendezvous with Le Hardi to help escort the incomplete battleship  to Casablanca a few days before the French signed an armistice with the Germans on 22 June. Casque, Lansquenet and Le Corsaire took refuge in French North Africa in mid-June despite the latter only being 82% complete.

The hulls of L'Opiniâtre and L'Aventurier were captured intact in Bordeaux in June 1940, 16% and 13% complete respectively. The Germans decided to complete them and renamed them ZF6 and ZF7. As their intended French weapons were unavailable, they were to be armed with five  SK C/34 guns with 80 rounds per gun, four  AA guns with 6000 rounds, ten  C/38 AA guns with 20,000 rounds and two quadruple mounts for  torpedo tubes amidships.

Work resumed on the two ships in February 1941, but construction on ZF7 was abandoned in June and some material was incorporated in ZF6 which was renamed ZF2 on 26 August. Work on that ship was terminated in July 1943 before she was launched and she was demolished when the Germans abandoned the area after Operation Dragoon in August 1944. Her wreck was scrapped after the end of the war. The French resumed construction on L'Aventurier in 1945 and she was launched two years later. The ship was used as an experimental hulk before she became a mooring pontoon at Brest and was listed for sale on 21 April 1971.

Le Hardi played a minor role in the Battle of Dakar in September, mostly laying smoke screens. After the battle, Fleuret and Épée were two of the four destroyers ordered to attack British shipping, although their only combat was an inconclusive duel with a British destroyer. Le Hardi, Épée, Mameluk, Lansquenet and Fleuret helped to escort the battleship , which had been damaged by the British during their July attack on Mers-el-Kébir, French Algeria, to Toulon in November 1940. Upon their arrival, three of the ships were assigned to the 10e (DT; 10th Destroyer Division), which was assigned to local defence duties, and the others were reduced to reserve. Casque and Le Corsaire arrived at Toulon later. Assignments to the unit rotated as ships were refitted because the French were only allowed to have three ships of the class active at any one time. On 1 April 1941, Fleuret was renamed Foudroyant, Épée to L'Adroit, Le Corsaire to Siroco and Le Flibustier to Bison to commemorate destroyers that had been sunk during the Battle of France. The 10e DT was assigned to the FHM on 1 November.

When the Germans invaded Vichy France after the Allies invaded French North Africa in November 1942 and tried to seize the French fleet, all but one of the seaworthy destroyers were scuttled to prevent their capture. While the Vichy Navy made some effort to finish Le Intrépide or Le Téméraire after the armistice, they were only 20% and 15% complete when the Germans occupied Vichy France and they made no effort to finish them. The Germans turned the ships in Toulon over to the Italians shortly after occupying the city. Bison, the only ship not scuttled, was still incomplete and was not completed by the Italians although they gave her the designation of FR 35. Mameluk, Casque and L'Adroit were the three ships assigned to the 10e DT on active duty. The latter was the only one of the trio to be salvaged as the work on the other two was interrupted by Allied bombing in 1944. Lansquenet was towed to Italy in April 1943 for completion as FR34. L'Adroit, renamed FR33 by the Italians and Foudroyant, renamed FR36, remained in Toulon after they were salvaged in April and May, respectively.

All of the ships were captured by the Germans after the Italian armistice in September, but they only made an effort to repair or complete Lansquenet which they renamed as TA34, reusing the designation of a torpedo boat that had been transferred to Croatia in 1944. She was scuttled in Genoa in May 1945, following Le Hardi in April and Sirocco in October 1944. Foudroyant was scuttled again by the Germans as a blockship in Toulon in August while Bison sank after a collision with a submarine in June. L'Adroit was sunk by Allied air raids in 1944. Lansquenet was salvaged in 1946 and towed back to Toulon in March 1946 where she was renamed Cyclone. Never repaired or returned to service, she was stricken in 1958 and subsequently scrapped.

Notes

References

 
 
 

 
World War II destroyers of France
Destroyer classes
Ship classes of the French Navy